Sir Robert Heron, 2nd Baronet (27 November 1765 – 29 May 1854) was a British Whig politician. He sat in the House of Commons from 1812 to 1847, with a break in 1818–1819.

Early life
He was born in Newark-on-Trent, Nottinghamshire, the son of Thomas Heron of Chilham Castle, Kent, Recorder of Newark and educated at St John's College, Cambridge. He inherited his baronetcy and extensive estates in Lincolnshire from his uncle, Sir Richard Heron, 1st Baronet on the latter's death in 1805.

Parliament 
He served as High Sheriff of Lincolnshire for 1809–10 and was then elected at the 1812 general election as a member of parliament (MP) for Great Grimsby.
He held the seat until the next general election, in 1818, when he did not stand again in Grimsby. He did however, stand in 1818, for election in Lincolnshire County, though unsuccessfully.

He returned to the Commons the following year, when he was elected at a by-election in November 1819 as an MP for Peterborough.
He held that seat until the 1847 general election, when he did not stand again.

Stubton Hall 
Heron owned Stubton Hall, a large estate at Stubton (near Newark-on-Trent) on the border of Lincolnshire and Nottinghamshire. The estate had belonged to the Heron family from since 1789, and the 17th-century hall was extensively rebuilt in the early 19th century by Sir Robert. He had initially used it as a summer retreat, but after being elected to Parliament he decided to make Stubton his main home. The architect Jeffry Wyatt drew up plans for remodelling, which had to be revised after the building was found to be in a poorer condition than was thought, and the resulting works were a big drain on Heron's finances: in January 1814 he recorded in his diary that he had spent £7,000 just get the building "covered in".

He also kept a large menagerie, and successfully bred a range of exotic animals including llamas, alpacas. lemurs, porcupines, armadillos and kangaroos.

Sir Robert and his wife Amelia, daughter and coheir of Sir Horace Mann, 2nd Baronet; had no children, and thus the baronetcy became extinct on his death. The estate passed to George Nevile, a relation of Amelia, and then to Sir Ralph Wilmot, 6th Baronet, on whose death it was sold to Edmund Royds.

Stubton Hall was restored in 2009, and re-opened as a wedding venue.

References

External links 
 
 

1765 births
1854 deaths
People from Newark-on-Trent
Whig (British political party) MPs
Alumni of St John's College, Cambridge
UK MPs 1812–1818
UK MPs 1818–1820
UK MPs 1820–1826
UK MPs 1826–1830
UK MPs 1830–1831
UK MPs 1831–1832
UK MPs 1832–1835
UK MPs 1835–1837
UK MPs 1837–1841
UK MPs 1841–1847
Politics of Peterborough
Baronets in the Baronetage of Great Britain
High Sheriffs of Lincolnshire
Members of the Parliament of the United Kingdom for Great Grimsby